Gospel 88.7 (88.7 FM) was a radio station in the Cayman Islands in the British West Indies. The station was owned by Christian Communications Association.

The station's license was last issued on 20 January 2005, but broadcasting began continuously on 8 August 2005.  The station is no longer in operation.

Programming
Gospel 88.7 airs a mix of Southern Gospel, Caribbean Gospel and Black Gospel, along with Bible teaching programs.

Some of the programs heard on the air include: Focus on the Family International, The Alternative with Dr. Tony Evans, Truth For Life with Alistair Begg, The Word for Today with Chuck Smith, The Mini Bible College with Dick Woodward, Unshackled, Just Thinking with Dr. Ravi Zacharias, Real Radio with Jack Hibbs, Searchlight with Jon Courson, A Walk in the Light with Bil Galitan, and Leading the Way with Dr. Michael Youssef.

References

Radio stations in the Cayman Islands
Radio stations established in 2005
Christian radio stations in North America
2005 establishments in the Cayman Islands
Defunct radio stations in the United Kingdom